Northville, New York may refer to two places in the United States:

Northville, Fulton County, New York
Northville, Suffolk County, New York